Ranga may refer to:

 Konda Venkata Ranga Reddy (1890–1970), Indian politician in Andhra Pradesh, participant in the Telangana rebellion
 N G Ranga, Indian leader
 Ranga Sohoni (1918–1993), Indian Test cricketer
 S. V. Ranga Rao (1918–1974), South Indian actor, director and producer
 Ranga (1982 film), a 1982 Tamil film
 Ranga (2022 film), a 2022 Tamil film

Places 
 Ranga Reddy district, a district in Andhra Pradesh, India; named after Konda Venkata Ranga Reddy
 Ytri Rangá and Eystri-Rangá, rivers in Iceland
 Ranga, Sahibganj, village in Jharkhand, India

Other uses 
 The Ananga Ranga, an Indian love manual
 Karnataka Kranti Ranga, a regional political party in Karnataka, India
 Neo Ranga, an anime television series
 Parambassis ranga, the Indian glassy fish
 Ranga, Yolngu (a northern Australian Aboriginal language) term for sacred object
 Ranga, an Australian term for people with orange or red hair
 Ranga (ship), a container ship wrecked off the coast of Ireland
 Ranganatha, a Hindu deity